Boogie Oogie is a Brazilian telenovela produced and broadcast by TV Globo. It premiered on 4 August 2014, replacing Meu Pedacinho de Chão and ended on 6 March 2015, replaced by Sete Vidas.

It was created by Rui Vilhena and starred Ísis Valverde, Bianca Bin, Marco Pigossi, Deborah Secco, Heloísa Périssé, Fabiula Nascimento, José Loreto, Betty Faria, Francisco Cuoco, Guilherme Fontes, Daniel Dantas, Alice Wegmann, Sandra Corveloni, Rita Elmôr, Bruno Garcia, Alexandra Richter, Fabrício Boliveira, Letícia Spiller, Marco Ricca, Giulia Gam and Alessandra Negrini.

Synopsis 
The story begins in 1956. Fernando's lover, Susana, dreams of the day when he will separate from his wife Carlota to stay with her. This plan, however, goes awry; Fernando discovers that his wife is pregnant and decides to leave Susana. Bitter and desperate, Susana can only think of revenge. The day that Carlota gives birth, she hires a nurse to switch the daughter of the couple for another girl, just for the pleasure of knowing that they are going to spend life away from the true heiress. Sandra, Fernando and Carlota's real daughter, is raised by repressed housewife Beatriz and military man Elísio; while Fernando and Carlota raise Vitória, Beatriz and Elísio's biological daughter.

More than 20 years later, in 1978, on Sandra and Alex's wedding day, a tragedy occurs that changes her life forever: the girl's groom tragically dies. On the way to the church, there is a plane crash and Alex saves the pilot but is trapped and an explosion kills him. The pilot he saved is Rafael, Vitória's boyfriend. Sandra blames Rafael for the death of her loved one.

Despite her efforts to hate him, she falls in love with him and then they live a nice love story. But this love will not be easy. As if the dispute for the same man were not enough, Sandra and Victoria discover that they were exchanged in the maternity ward. Thereafter, the rivalry between the two only increases.

Another figure that promises to be a stone in the shoe of the protagonist is Pedro. Obsessed with Sandra, the soldier has never accepted the fact that she chose to stay with Alex, his brother, in the past. With the death of his rival, he believes he has a chance to win her back. And for that, he will do whatever is necessary. Upon learning that the girl has a new love, the officer will use all his tricks to separate her from Rafael.

Cast

References

External links 
  
 

2014 telenovelas
Brazilian telenovelas
2014 Brazilian television series debuts
2015 Brazilian television series endings
TV Globo telenovelas
Portuguese-language telenovelas
Television series set in 1978